is a professional Go player.

Biography 
Komatsu was born in Aichi, Japan and quickly rose among the ranks of Go in the 1980s and early 1990s. He currently resides in Tokyo, Japan.

Promotion record

Titles & runners-up

References

1967 births
Japanese Go players
Living people